The Nelson Garden, on 13 Chippenhamgate Street, at the rear of No.18 Monnow Street, Monmouth, Monmouthshire is a 19th-century garden that was the scene of a tea party held to honour Lord Nelson in 1802. The garden is one of 24 sites on the Monmouth Heritage Trail.  It is bounded on the south by the line of the medieval town wall through which it is entered via a short underground passageway. The garden has limited public access and is now managed by a trust. It is included on the Cadw/ICOMOS Register of Parks and Gardens of Special Historic Interest in Wales.

History
The walled garden was the site of a real tennis court in the 17th century and was a bowling green by 1718. It then became an orchard; an example of an 18th-century hypocaust (heated) wall still survives, where fruit trees would have been 'espaliered' (trained flat) against the warm brickwork. There are traces of the stoking chamber for this wall in a neighbouring garden.  Roman and Norman remains lie deep beneath the lawn.

The Nelson Garden commemorates Lord Nelson's visit to Monmouth on August 19, 1802, with Sir William and Lady Emma Hamilton on the occasion of their tour of the Wye Valley.  Having been entertained at the Beaufort Arms, the party adjourned "accompanied by Colonel Lindsay to the beautiful summerhouse in his garden there to enjoy the refreshment of tea or coffee and to pass the rest of the evening in that charming retreat".  Although the 'charming retreat' has vanished, in about 1840 the present Memorial Pavilion was erected, possibly to the design of George Vaughan Maddox, the Monmouth architect. Being of timber, various parts have had to be replaced over time and it is not known how much of the current structure is original. "Lord Nelson's Seat" remains an attractive feature, bearing a plaque commemorating Nelson's visit.  The Royal Commission on the Ancient and Historical Monuments of Wales describes the summerhouse as "important and unusual."

Until 1950 the managers of the adjoining Lloyds Bank maintained the garden.  This changed when their families were allowed to live elsewhere, but the garden continued to be maintained by resident tenants. Thereafter it deteriorated, but in 1994 the Nelson Society and Monmouth Archaeological Society, began restoration. In 1996 the Welsh Historic Gardens Trust became involved and in 1997 set up a restoration committee to care for the garden.  In 2001 the committee negotiated a 10-year sub-lease from Lloyds Bank, funded conservation work on the entrance tunnel, and installed a decorative iron screen to separate the garden from the rest of the bank property. 

The garden is now managed by the Nelson Garden Preservation Trust which aims to establish a comprehensive historic restoration scheme and ensure its long-term future. The garden is usually open to the public between April and September on Fridays between 2–4 p.m.

Architecture and listings
The garden structures, including the pavilion, are Grade II* listed. The garden itself is listed at Grade II on the Cadw/ICOMOS Register of Parks and Gardens of Special Historic Interest in Wales.

Gallery

Notes

References
Newman J., The Buildings of Wales: Gwent/Monmouthshire, (2000) Penguin Books

External links
The Nelson Garden website

Gardens in Wales
Buildings and structures in Monmouth, Wales
Grade II* listed buildings in Monmouthshire
Tourist attractions in Monmouthshire
Monmouth, Wales
Monuments and memorials to Horatio Nelson
Registered historic parks and gardens in Monmouthshire